Dyella thiooxydans is a Gram-negative, aerobic, rod-shaped, thiosulfate-oxidizing, facultatively chemolithotrophic and motile bacterium from the genus of Dyella which has been isolated from rhizospheric soil of field with sunflowers (Helianthus annuus) from Junghwa-dong in Korea.

References

Xanthomonadales
Bacteria described in 2011